Dzhanan Manolova (born 16 May 1993) is a Bulgarian freestyle wrestler. She won a bronze medal at the 2015 World Wrestling Championships held in Las Vegas, United States. She is also a two-time bronze medalist at the European Wrestling Championships.

Major results

References

External links 
 

Living people
1993 births
Sportspeople from Mainz
Bulgarian female sport wrestlers
World Wrestling Championships medalists
European Wrestling Championships medalists
Wrestlers at the 2015 European Games
European Games competitors for Bulgaria
21st-century Bulgarian women